Communist Party of Bharat is a Naxalite splinter group of Communist Party of India (Marxist-Leninist). This party has a presence in West Bengal. The party was behind the agitation in Singur and Nandigram. 
The party secretary is Ranjan Chakraborty and Barnali Mukherjee is the other leader working in mass fronts.
The Party distanced itself away from the movement that stemmed from the Nandigram and Singur agitation, citing that the movement went further from a popular movement to a business-lobby backed 'false' movement in spite of other Left parties entangling with the movement.

References

Communist militant groups
Communist parties in India
Left-wing militant groups in India
Maoist organisations in India
Naxalite–Maoist insurgency
Political parties in West Bengal
Political parties with year of establishment missing